A talk box (also spelled talkbox and talk-box) is an effects unit that allows musicians to modify the sound of a musical instrument by shaping the frequency content of the sound and to apply speech sounds (in the same way as singing) onto the sounds of the instrument. Typically, a talk box directs sound from the instrument into the musician's mouth by means of a plastic tube adjacent to a vocal microphone. The musician controls the modification of the instrument's sound by changing the shape of the mouth, "vocalizing" the instrument's output into a microphone.

Overview

A talk box is usually an effects pedal that sits on the floor and contains a speaker attached with an airtight connection to a plastic tube; however, it can come in other forms, including homemade, usually crude, versions, and higher quality custom-made versions. The speaker is generally in the form of a compression driver, the sound-generating part of a horn loudspeaker with the horn replaced by the tube connection.

The box has connectors for the connection to the speaker output of an instrument amplifier and a connection to a normal instrument speaker. A foot-operated switch on the box directs the sound either to the talk box speaker or to the normal speaker. The switch is usually a push-on/push-off type. The other end of the tube is taped to the side of a microphone, extending enough to direct the reproduced sound in or near the performer's mouth.

When activated, the sound from the amplifier is reproduced by the speaker in the talk box and directed through the tube into the performer's mouth. The shape of the mouth filters the sound, with the modified sound being picked up by the microphone. The shape of the mouth changes the harmonic content of the sound in the same way it affects the harmonic content generated by the vocal folds when speaking.

The performer can vary the shape of the mouth and position of the tongue, changing the sound of the instrument being reproduced by the talk box speaker. The performer can mouth words, with the resulting effect sounding as though the instrument is speaking. This "shaped" sound exits the performer's mouth, and when it enters a microphone, an instrument/voice hybrid is heard.

The sound can be that of any musical instrument, but the effect is most commonly associated with the guitar. The rich harmonics of an electric guitar are shaped by the mouth, producing a sound very similar to voice, effectively allowing the guitar to appear to "speak".

The effect produced by talk boxes and vocoders are often conflated by listeners. However, they have radically different mechanisms for achieving the effect. Talk boxes send the carrier signal into the singer's mouth, where it is then modulated by the singer themselves. On the other hand, vocoders process both the carrier and the modulator signal integrally, producing the output as a separate electric signal. In addition, they are also more common in different genres: a talk box is often found in rock music due to its typical pairing with a guitar, whereas vocoders are almost always paired with synthesizers, and as such, are ubiquitous in electronic music.

History

Singing guitar

In 1939, Alvino Rey, amateur radio operator W6UK, used a carbon throat microphone wired in such a way as to modulate his electric steel guitar sound. The mic, originally developed for military pilot communications, was placed on the throat of Rey's wife Luise King (one of The King Sisters), who stood behind a curtain and mouthed the words, along with the guitar lines. The novel-sounding combination was called "Singing Guitar", and employed on stage and in the movie Jam Session, as a "novelty" attraction, but was not developed further.

Rey also created a somewhat similar "talking" effect by manipulating the tone controls of his Fender electric guitar, but the vocal effect was less pronounced.

Sonovox
Another early voice effect using the same principle of the throat as a filter was the Sonovox, invented by Gilbert Wright in 1939. Instead of a throat microphone modulating a guitar signal, it used small transducers attached to the performer's throat to produce sounds the mouth shapes. The Sonovox was marketed and promoted by the Wright-Sonovox company, an affiliate of the Free & Peters advertising agency.

The Sonovox was used in many radio station IDs and jingles produced by JAM Creative Productions and the PAMS advertising agency of Dallas, Texas. Lucille Ball made one of her earliest film appearances during the 1930s in a Pathé Newsreel demonstrating the Sonovox.

The first use in music was a score by Ernst Toch in the Paramount Picture "The Ghost Breakers", in June 1940. The Sonovox was used to produce the "voice" of the anthropomorphic train Casey Jr. in the 1941 animated film Dumbo, and was also used for the "talking piano" in a children's record issued on Capitol Records entitled Sparky's Magic Piano.

Talking steel guitar

Pete Drake, a Nashville-based player of the pedal steel guitar, used a talk box on his 1964 album Forever, in what came to be called his "talking steel guitar". The following year Gallant released three albums with the box, Pete Drake & His Talking Guitar, Talking Steel and Singing Strings, and Talking Steel Guitar. Drake's device consisted of an 8-inch paper cone speaker driver attached to a funnel from which a clear tube brought the sound to the performer's mouth. It was only loud enough to be useful in the recording studio.

Another prominent use of the talking steel guitar appears in The Ventures' Christmas Album, released in 1965. In the song "Silver Bells", Red Rhodes spoke through a talk box, distorting the phrase silver bells.

Kustom Electronics talk box ("The Bag")
The Kustom Electronics device "The Bag" was the first mass market talk box and was housed in a decorative bag slung over the shoulder like a wine bottle. It used a 30-watt driver and was released to the mass music market in early 1969, two years before Bob Heil's talk box became widely available. The Bag is claimed to have been designed by Doug Forbes, who states that exactly the same concept (speaker attached to a plastic tube and inserted into the mouth) had previously been patented as an artificial larynx.

Stevie Wonder gave the talk box its first national television prominence, performing a medley of The Carpenters and Jackson 5 songs all via a Kustom Bag live on the David Frost show in 1972. The performance was later sampled by Frank Ocean.

David Gilmour of Pink Floyd, who automatically doubles his guitar leads by singing them as he plays (whether on mic or not), was an obvious candidate for both the talk box and the vocoder, experimenting with merging voice and instrument into a single unified sound. The effect was employed during the lengthy guitar solo sections of "Raving and Drooling" and "You've Got to Be Crazy" on the 1974 tour, which would eventually become "Sheep" and "Dogs" on the Animals album.

Jeff Beck was seen using the Kustom Bag talk box in May 1973 on Superstition at a Santa Monica concert. He also used it on "She's a Woman" from his 1975 release Blow by Blow, and was seen using it for the song on BBC television program "Five Faces of the Guitar" in 1974 in which he also explains its use to the host of the show.

Heil high-powered talk box
The first high-powered talk box was developed by Bob Heil. Heil came up with the first high-powered talk box that could be reliable when used on high-level rock stages. His first Heil talk box was built for Joe Walsh's Barnstorm tour. Heil and Walsh, both avid ham radio operators (K9EID and WB6ACU, respectively), along with Walsh's guitar tech "Krinkle", combined a 250-watt JBL driver and suitable hi-pass filter which was used for Walsh's single "Rocky Mountain Way". Walsh gives credit to Bill West, an electrical engineer, Nashville steel guitarist and first husband of country-music legend Dottie West, for inventing the talk box for him in a 2006 interview with Howard Stern.

Pete Townshend, in his 2012 autobiography Who I Am, claimed to have invented a version of the talk box during a Who tour of the US in 1976. "I built a speaker in a small box, attached a tube and put the tube in my mouth, allowing me to speak music."

In 1988, Heil sold the manufacturing rights to Dunlop Manufacturing, Inc., which currently builds the Heil talk box to the exact standards that Heil designed in 1973.

The classic rock artist Peter Frampton made extensive use of the talk box in his music. In an interview for the 1999 DVD Live in Detroit, Frampton says he first heard the talk box in 1970 while sitting in on sessions for George Harrison's All Things Must Pass. While he sat next to Pete Drake in the album sessions at Abbey Road Studios, he heard Pete using it with a pedal steel guitar. Frampton said in the same interview that the sound it produced reminded him of an audio effect he loved listening to on Radio Luxembourg in the later 1960s. Frampton acquired one as a Christmas present from Bob Heil in 1974. It was a hand-built talk box in a fiberglass box using a 100-watt high-powered driver. This was the Heil talk box used for the Frampton Comes Alive tour and album. He then promptly locked himself away in a practice space for two weeks, and came out with some mastery of it. Due to the success of the albums Frampton and Frampton Comes Alive!, and particularly the hit singles "Do You Feel Like We Do" and "Show Me the Way", Frampton has become somewhat synonymous with the talk box.

Peter Frampton also now sells his own line of custom-designed "Framptone" products, including a talk box.

In 1976, Steely Dan guitarist Walter Becker recorded the talk box effect atop an already-recorded Dean Parks solo in "Haitian Divorce", on the album The Royal Scam. Also from 1977, Johnnie "Guitar" Watson used a talk box. The 1974 album 461 Ocean Boulevard features Eric Clapton using a talk box during his outgoing solo on the song "Mainline Florida".

ElectroSpit
Producer Bosko, who played talk box on Big Boi's 2010 album Sir Lucious Left Foot: The Son of Chico Dusty, conceived an alternative to the cumbersome and unsanitary talk box in mid-2014, imagining a neck-worn electronic system that would be easier to use. Bosko showed the ElectroSpit prototype in 2016, and launched a Kickstarter campaign in June 2018. The device sends sound into the mouth by way of electromagnetic transducers placed against the throat, allowing the user to shape the sounds of a synthesizer, guitar or any other electronic source. Bosko released the ElectroSpit product in 2019, showing it at the NAMM Show. Early users of the ElectroSpit include P-Thugg of Chromeo, Terrace Martin who works with Kendrick Lamar, and Teddy Riley.

Notable uses

 "2021" – Vampire Weekend
 "24K Magic" – Bruno Mars
 "Anything Goes" – Guns N' Roses
 "The Ballad [Denny & Jean]" – Todd Rundgren
 "Beverly Hills" – Weezer
 "Blacked Out World" – Black Label Society
 "Black Man" – Stevie Wonder
 "Bounce" – Bon Jovi
 "Bullet" – Bon Jovi
 "Burning My Soul – Dream Theater
 "Butterfly Bleu" – Iron Butterfly
 "California Love" – 2Pac, Roger Troutman, Dr. Dre
 "Cause I Love You" – Scorpions
 "Complicated" – Bon Jovi
 "Dan Dare (Pilot of the Future)" – Elton John
 "Delilah" – Queen
 "Do You Feel Like We Do" – Peter Frampton (1976)
 "Dust N' Bones" – Guns N' Roses
 "East St. Louis Toodle-Oo" – Steely Dan
 "Erase This" – Lamb of God
 "Everyday" – Bon Jovi
 "Falling into Grace" – Red Hot Chili Peppers
 "Fire It Up" – Black Label Society
 "Funkify Your Life" – The Meters
 "Funky Crime" – Red Hot Chili Peppers
 "Generator" – Foo Fighters
 "Get Off" – Foxy (1978)
 "Get Out the Door" – Velvet Revolver
 "Glass Prison" – Dream Theater
 "Guerrilla Radio" – Rage Against the Machine
 "Hair of the Dog" – Nazareth
 "Haitian Divorce" – Steely Dan
 "Hey Lawdy Mama" – Steppenwolf
 "Happy Now" – Bon Jovi
 "The Hole in My Wall" – Warrant
 "Hot Number" – Foxy
 "The House Jack Built" – Metallica
 "The Healing Colors of Sound" – Spock's Beard
 "I Stand Alone" – Godsmack
 "I Want To Be Loved" – Bon Jovi
 "It's My Life" – Bon Jovi
 "Jambi" – Tool
 "Just a Girl" − No Doubt
 "Keep Talking" – Pink Floyd
 "Kickstart My Heart" – Mötley Crüe
 "Larger than Life" – Backstreet Boys
 "Lay Me Down" – Avicii
 "Live in a Hole" – Pantera
 "Livin' on a Prayer" – Bon Jovi
 "Love Me Back to Life" – Bon Jovi
 "Man in the Box" – Alice in Chains
 "Me and My Gang" – Rascal Flatts
 "Media Overkill" – Scorpions
 "Mind Bender" - Stillwater
 "Money Maker" – The Black Keys
 "Money and Fame" – Scorpions
 "Monkey on Your Back" – Aldo Nova
 "More Bounce to the Ounce" – Zapp (1980)
 "Neckbrace" – Ratatat
 "Night Drive" – The All-American Rejects
 "The New Workout Plan" – Kanye West
 "No Pain No Gain" – Scorpions
 "Outta My Head" – Daughtry
 "Pigs (Three Different Ones)" – Pink Floyd (1977)
 "Playing with Fire" – Richard Marx 
 "Put the Boy Back in Cowboy" – Bon Jovi
 "Rocket Queen (live)" – Guns N' Roses
 "Rocky Mountain Way" – Joe Walsh (1973)
 "Rotten Apple" – Alice in Chains
 "Sexual Eruption" – Snoop Dogg
 "She's a Woman" – Jeff Beck (1975)
 "Show Me the Way" – Peter Frampton (1976)
 "S-S-S-Single Bed" – Fox (1976)
 "Sweet Emotion" – Aerosmith (1975)
 "Tell Me Something Good" – Rufus (1974)
 "Wake Up" – Rage Against the Machine
 "We Got It Going On" – Bon Jovi
 "Work Out" – J. Cole
 "The Zoo" – Scorpions

Non-musical uses
A talk box connected to an iPad running an effects program was used to create the voice of the character BB-8 in Star Wars: The Force Awakens.

See also
Auto-Tune
Vocoder
Wah-wah pedal

References

External links
 National Talkbox Association's Website
 GF Works Talkbox Index
 The Talkbox FAQ
 The Effects Database Forum – The Bag

Effects units
Tone, EQ and filter
Digital signal processing
Sound recording
Music hardware
2010s in music